Thomas Warner (31 August 1902 – 25 August 1987) was a South African cricketer. He played in three first-class matches for Border from 1922/23 to 1929/30.

See also
 List of Border representative cricketers

References

External links
 

1902 births
1987 deaths
South African cricketers
Border cricketers